Waikawa is the name of three small settlements and a river in New Zealand.
Waikawa, Southland
Waikawa, Marlborough
Waikawa Beach, a bach community between Ōtaki and Levin in the Horowhenua Region
Waikawa River in Southland